Ramsey railway station, or Ramsey station, may refer to:

 Ramsey railway station (Manx Electric Railway), a station in Ramsey on the Isle of Man
 Ramsey railway station (Isle of Man Railway), a disused station in Ramsey on the Isle of Man
 Ramsey railway station (Ontario), a sign post station stop in Ramsey, Ontario, Canada
 Ramsey station (Metro Transit), a rail station of Metro Transit in Ramsey, Minnesota, USA
 Ramsey station (NJT), a rail station of New Jersey Transit on Main Street in Ramsey, New Jersey, USA

See also
 Ramsey East railway station, a disused station in Ramsey, Cambridgeshire, England
 Ramsey North railway station, a disused station in Ramsey, Cambridgeshire, England
 Ramsey Route 17 station, a rail station of New Jersey Transit on Route 17 in Ramsey, New Jersey, USA
 Ramsey (disambiguation), for other articles with Ramsey in their title